Reetika Gina Vazirani (9 August 1962 – 16 July 2003) was an Indian/American immigrant poet and educator.

Life
Vazirani was born in Patiala, India, in 1962 and went to the United States with her family in 1968. After graduating from Wellesley College in 1984, she received a Thomas J. Watson Fellowship to travel to India, Thailand, Japan, and China. She also received an M.F.A. from the University of Virginia as a Hoyns Fellow.

Vazirani lived in Trenton, New Jersey, with her son Jehan, near the poet Yusef Komunyakaa, who was her partner and Jehan's father. There she taught creative writing as a visiting faculty member at The College of New Jersey.  At the time of her death, Vazirani was Writer-in-Residence at the College of William & Mary in Williamsburg, Virginia, with the intent of joining the English department at Emory University.
On 16 July 2003, Vazirani was housesitting in the Chevy Chase, Maryland, home of novelist Howard Norman and his wife, the poet, Jane Shore. There, Vazirani killed her two-year-old son, Jehan, by stabbing him multiple times, then fatally stabbed herself.

Works
Vazirani was the author of two poetry collections, White Elephants, winner of the 1995 Barnard New Women Poets Prize, and World Hotel (Copper Canyon Press, 2002), winner of the 2003 Anisfield-Wolf book award. She was a contributing and advisory editor for Shenandoah, a book review editor for Callaloo, and a senior poetry editor for Catamaran, a journal of South Asian literature. She translated poetry from Urdu and had some of her poems translated into Italian.

Her poem "Mouth-Organs and Drums" was published in the anthology Poets Against the War (Nation Books, 2003).

Vazirani's final collection of poetry, Radha Says, edited by Leslie McGrath and Ravi Shankar, was published in 2009 by Drunken Boat Media.

Awards
 2003, Anisfield-Wolf Book Award
 1995, Barnard Women Poets Prize

She was a recipient of a Discovery/The Nation Award, a Pushcart Prize, the Poets & Writers Exchange Program Award, fellowships from the Bread Loaf and Sewanee writers conferences, the Glenna Luschei/Prairie Schooner Award for her essay, "The Art of Breathing," included in the anthology How We Live our Yoga (Beacon 2001). She also had a poem in The Best American Poetry 2000.

References

External links 
The initial report in the Washington Post about the murder/suicide 
An article in the Washington Post, speculating about the murder/suicide
Born, a poem from her final collection on Drunken Boat.
A profile on ChickenBones: a Journal, with two poems
The text of Mouth-Organs and Drums, from "Poets Against War"
For our Sisterhood, a poem by Uma Parameswaran about Reetika Vazirani
, Three Poems by Reetika Vazirani.
 Daughter-Mother-Maya-Seeta by Reetika Vazirani

1962 births
2003 murders in the United States
2003 suicides
20th-century American poets
20th-century American women writers
20th-century Indian poets
20th-century Indian translators
20th-century Indian women writers
American female murderers
American murderers
American murderers of children
American people of Sindhi descent
American writers of Indian descent
American women poets
American women writers of Indian descent
College of William & Mary faculty
English-language poets from India
Filicides in the United States
Indian emigrants to the United States
Indian women poets
Indian women translators
Murder–suicides in the United States
People from Patiala
Poets from New Jersey
Poets from Punjab, India
Suicides by sharp instrument in the United States
Suicides in Maryland
Urdu–English translators
Watson Fellows
Wellesley College alumni
Women writers from Punjab, India